Seyar-e Sofla or Sir-e Sofla may refer to:
 Seyar-e Sofla, East Azerbaijan
 Sir-e Sofla, Kurdistan